The men's horizontal bar event was part of the gymnastics programme at the 1928 Summer Olympics. It was one of seven gymnastics events for men and it was contested for the fourth time after 1896, 1904, and 1924. Scores from the horizontal bar event were added to the results from other individual apparatus events to give aggregate scores for the individual and team all-around events. There were 86 gymnasts from 11 nations, with each nation having a team of up to 8 gymnasts. The event was won by Georges Miez of Switzerland, the nation's first victory in the men's horizontal bar. The silver medal went to Romeo Neri of Italy (the nation's first medal in the event), with Eugen Mack of Switzerland earning bronze.

Background

This was the fourth appearance of the event, which is one of the five apparatus events held every time there were apparatus events at the Summer Olympics (no apparatus events were held in 1900, 1908, 1912, or 1920). Four of the top 10 gymnasts from 1924 returned: gold medalist Leon Štukelj of Yugoslavia, fifth-place finisher Georges Miez of Switzerland, sixth-place finisher Jean Gounot of France, and eighth-place finisher August Güttinger of Switzerland. Štukelj was also the two-time reigning (1922 and 1926) world champion.

The Netherlands made its debut in the men's parallel bars. Hungary competed for the first time since 1896. The other nine nations had all competed in 1924. Switzerland and the United States each made their third appearance, tied for most of any nation.

Competition format

Each gymnast performed a compulsory exercise and a voluntary exercise. The maximum score for each exercise was 30 points. The horizontal bar was one of the apparatus used in the individual and team all-around scores.

Schedule

Results
Source: Official results; De Wael

References

Gymnastics at the 1928 Summer Olympics
Men's 1928
Men's events at the 1928 Summer Olympics